Bruce Arnold Dunbar Stocker  (26 May 1917 – 30 August 2004) was an English-born academic. He was Professor of Microbiology and Immunology at Stanford University from 1966 to 1987.

Early life and family
Born in Hambledon, Surrey, England, on 26 May 1917, Stocker was the son of Eustace Dupuis Henchman Stocker and Ruth Mary Richmond Stocker (née Hursthouse). Eustace Stocker was a military officer who won the Military Cross in World War I, and was appointed an Officer and then Commander of the Order of the British Empire during World War II. Ruth Stocker was the daughter of Richmond Hursthouse, a Member of Parliament and cabinet minister in New Zealand. In 1956, Bruce Stocker married Jane Beveridge in Chelsea, London, and the couple went on to have two daughters.

Education and scientific career
Stocker was educated at King's College London and Westminster Hospital Medical School. He was Guinness Professor of Microbiology at the University of London until 1965.

In 1966 Stocker was elected a Fellow of the Royal Society. He died in Palo Alto, California, on 30 August 2004.

References

1917 births
2004 deaths
Alumni of King's College London
Fellows of the Royal Society
Academics of the University of London
Stanford University faculty
Atkinson–Hursthouse–Richmond family
People from the Borough of Waverley